Wagener House may refer to the following historic houses in Yates County, New York, United States
 Abraham Wagener House
 Charles Wagener House
 H. Allen Wagener House